Karl Ritter von Stremayr (30 October 1823, Graz - 22 June 1904, Pottschach) was an Austrian statesman. He served as the 9th Minister-President of Cisleithania.

Political career 
Born in Graz, where he also studied law, he entered the government service, and subsequently was Attorney-General and docent at the University.

In 1848-49 he was a member of the Frankfurt Parliament. In 1868 he was appointed councilor in the Ministry of the Interior, and in 1870-79 was Minister of Public Instruction when he brought about the repeal of the Concordat of 1855.

He was president of the council as the 9th Minister-President of Cisleithania after the going out of the Auersperg ministry in 1879. Afterwards, he entered the cabinet of his successor Eduard Taaffe, 11th Viscount Taaffe, 10th Minister-President of Cisleithania, as Minister of Justice, but resigned in 1880.

He then was appointed vice president of the Austrian Supreme Court before succeeding Anton von Schmerling as president after Schmerling's resignation in 1891.

He retired in 1899. He was called to a seat in the Austrian House of Lords in 1889. Anton Bruckner dedicated to him his Fifth Symphony.

References

1823 births
1904 deaths
Politicians from Graz
People from the Duchy of Styria
Austrian knights
Ministers-President of Austria
Government ministers of Austria
Members of the Frankfurt Parliament
Members of the Austrian House of Deputies (1867–1870)
Members of the Austrian House of Deputies (1870–1871)
Members of the Austrian House of Deputies (1871–1873)
Members of the House of Lords (Austria)
19th-century Ministers-President of Austria
Grand Crosses of the Order of Saint Stephen of Hungary